The  Washington Redskins season was the franchise's 72nd season in the National Football League. The team failed to improve on their 7–9 record from 2002, dropping to 5-11 and missing the playoffs for the fourth straight year. This was their worst season since 1994.

This was the first season since 1982 that the Redskins did not have cornerback Darrell Green, who retired after the 2002 season. Owing to different formulas for intraconference scheduling used by the NFL before 2002, it was the first time since 1994 that the Redskins played the Atlanta Falcons and the first time ever the Redskins had played at the Georgia Dome, which opened in 1992. During the season the Redskins wore a patch on their jerseys with the initials "GSS: Hail to the Redskins" to commemorate Gerald S. Snyder, the father of owner Daniel Snyder who had died during the 2003 offseason.

Following the season, defensive end Bruce Smith retired after 19 seasons in the NFL, Pro Bowl defensive back Champ Bailey would be traded to the Denver Broncos and head coach Steve Spurrier left after spending only two seasons coaching the Redskins.

Offseason 
The Redskins acquired former New York Jets players Randy Thomas, John Hall, Laveranues Coles, and Chad Morton in free agency.

NFL Draft

Undrafted free agents

Roster

Regular season

Schedule

Standings

References 

Washington
Washington Redskins seasons
Red